The second season of the American comedy television series It's Always Sunny in Philadelphia premiered on FX on June 29, 2006. The season contains 10 episodes and concluded airing on August 17, 2006.

Season synopsis
The series' second season introduces veteran actor Danny DeVito portraying Dennis and Dee's father Frank, who moves in with wheelchair user Charlie following a car accident, and blackmails his way into the group. Anne Archer also has a recurring role as Barbara Reynolds, Dee and Dennis's promiscuous, cold-hearted mother. Meanwhile, Mac has sex with Barbara and spins a web of lies and deception in order to throw the rest of the gang off his tracks. 

The gang ups their efforts on the scheming front: the gang tries to fight back against a property anomaly that leaves their bar in the path of an Israeli immigrant's new place, Dennis and Dee quit their jobs and hatch a plot to get on welfare so they can live out their dream careers, and Frank—along with Charlie and Mac—exploit the religious when they discover a water stain in the back room that resembles The Virgin Mary. Charlie and Dee fight against cigarette smoking, while Frank, Mac, and Dennis fight back against their freedoms being encroached by making their bar an "anything goes" establishment that first attracts drunk college girls willing to flash their breasts for beads, but things do not go according to plan when heroin addicts, Vietnamese gamblers, and the incestuous McPoyle siblings get in on the action. At the end of the season, Dennis and Dee find a man on MySpace who claims (and turns out) to be their biological father, while Mac reunites with his convict dad, and Charlie is still trying to find the identity of his missing father.

Production
Before production of the second season began, series creator Rob McElhenney found out that Danny DeVito was a fan of the show and a friend of FX president, John Landgraf.  McElhenney asked Landgraf to set up a meeting.  McElhenney met DeVito at his home and pitched DeVito's character, Frank Reynolds.  DeVito agreed to star in the show, but was only available for twenty days. To have Frank Reynolds in all ten episodes of the second season, all of DeVito's scenes were filmed before filming the season.

Cast

Main cast
 Charlie Day as Charlie Kelly
 Glenn Howerton as Dennis Reynolds
 Rob McElhenney as Mac
 Kaitlin Olson as Dee Reynolds
 Danny DeVito as Frank Reynolds

Recurring cast
 Mary Elizabeth Ellis as The Waitress
 Anne Archer as Barbara Reynolds

Guest stars
 Natasha Leggero as Stripper #1
 Tiffany Haddish as Stripper #3
 Eddie Pepitone as Tony
 Aisha Hinds as Caseworker
 Lucy DeVito as Jenny
 Lynne Marie Stewart as Mrs. Kelly
 Sandy Martin as Mrs. Mac
 Eddie Mekka as Bobby Thunderson
 Patrick Hallahan as AA Director
 David Hornsby as Father Matthew Mara
 Jimmi Simpson as Liam McPoyle
 Nate Mooney as Ryan McPoyle
 Gregory Scott Cummins as Luther Mac
 Artemis Pebdani as Artemis
 Stephen Collins as Bruce Mathis

Episodes

Reception
The second season received positive reviews. On Rotten Tomatoes, it has an approval rating of 95% with an average score of 7.8 out of 10 based on 21 reviews. The website's critical consensus reads, "The Gang becomes complete with the addition of Danny DeVito, whose wily performance gives Always Sunny a new shine."

Home media
The season two episodes are presented in production order, rather than their original broadcast order.

References

External links 

 
 

2006 American television seasons
It's Always Sunny in Philadelphia